"Shimmy Shimmy Ya" is the second single by Ol' Dirty Bastard, from the album Return to the 36 Chambers: The Dirty Version (1995). It was produced by fellow Wu-Tang Clan member RZA. The song was ranked number 59 on VH1's 100 Greatest Songs of Hip Hop.

Music video
A music video was created for the song, directed by Hype Williams. The video shows a depiction of the 1970s, in which large afros and platform shoes were considered fashionable.

Track listing 
12" promo
 "Shimmy Shimmy Ya" (Extended Version Clean) – 3:38
 "Shimmy Shimmy Ya" (Extended Instrumental) – 3:39
 "Shimmy Shimmy Ya" (Clean) – 2:42
 "Baby C'mon" (Clean) – 3:38
 "Brooklyn Zoo" (Clean Lord Digga Remix) – 3:55
 "Give It To Ya Raw" – 4:08

12" remix promo
 "Shimmy Shimmy Ya" (Remix) – 4:10
 "Shimmy Shimmy Ya" (Remix) (Instrumental) – 4:10

12" and CD single
 "Shimmy Shimmy Ya" (Extended Version) – 3:48
 "Shimmy Shimmy Ya" – 2:46
 "Baby C'mon" – 3:38
 "Shimmy Shimmy Ya" (Extended Instrumental) – 3:38
 "Baby C'mon" (Instrumental) – 3:40
 "Shimmy Shimmy Ya" (Extended Acappella) – 3:27

CD promo and cassette single
 "Shimmy Shimmy Ya" (Extended Version Clean) – 3:40
 "Shimmy Shimmy Ya" (Clean) – 2:43

Studio Tōn remix promo
 "Shimmy Shimmy Ya" (Studio Ton Mix) – 4:10

Charts

Popular culture
The song was featured in the 2002 film 8 Mile.
The song was interpolated in the 2012 song "F**kin' Problems."
The song was featured in the 2020 film The Gentlemen.
The song briefly appears in the TV series Breaking Bad.

References

External links 
 Ol' Dirty Bastard Article – Billboard.com

1994 songs
1995 singles
Ol' Dirty Bastard songs
Music videos directed by Hype Williams
Song recordings produced by RZA
Songs written by RZA
Elektra Records singles